SIMA Águilas were an amateur soccer team based in Montverde, Florida that competed in USL League Two. The team was affiliated with the Montverde Academy.

History 

SIMA Águilas was announced as a Premier Development League expansion team on 2013, joining the Southeast Division.

Year-by-year

Staff

Notable players 
  Diego Campos – 2017
  Malick Mbaye – 2017 
  Seo-In Kim – 2018
  Randy Mendoza – 2018

References 

Association football clubs established in 2013
Soccer clubs in Florida
2013 establishments in Florida
Lake County, Florida
USL League Two teams
Association football clubs disestablished in 2018
2018 disestablishments in Florida